"Motorslug" is a song by Wiseblood, written by Roli Mosimann and J. G. Thirlwell. It was released as a single in May 1985 by K.422 and was included on the CD version of the album Dirtdish.

Formats and track listing 
All songs written by Roli Mosimann and J. G. Thirlwell
UK 12" single (WISE 112)
"Motorslug" – 9:39
"Death Rape 2000" – 7:33

Personnel
Adapted from the Motorslug liner notes.
Wiseblood
 Roli Mosimann – instruments
 J. G. Thirlwell (as Clint Ruin) – vocals, instruments, engineering
Production and additional personnel
 Jack Adams – engineering
 Ian North – engineering
 Steve Peck – mixing
 Wiseblood – musical arrangement, production

Charts

Release history

References

External links 
 
 Motorslug at foetus.org

1985 songs
1985 debut singles
Wiseblood (band) songs
Songs written by JG Thirlwell
Song recordings produced by JG Thirlwell